Washington Township is one of the twelve townships of Paulding County, Ohio, United States.  The 2000 census found 789 people in the township.

Geography
Located in the southeastern corner of the county, it borders the following townships:
Brown Township - north
Perry Township, Putnam County - east
Jackson Township, Putnam County - southeast
Monterey Township, Putnam County - south
Jackson Township, Van Wert County - southwest
Latty Township - west
Jackson Township - northwest corner

No municipalities are located in Washington Township, although the unincorporated communities of Mandale and Roselms lie in the township's southeast and southwest respectively.

Name and history
It is one of forty-three Washington Townships statewide.

Government
The township is governed by a three-member board of trustees, who are elected in November of odd-numbered years to a four-year term beginning on the following January 1. Two are elected in the year after the presidential election and one is elected in the year before it. There is also an elected township fiscal officer, who serves a four-year term beginning on April 1 of the year after the election, which is held in November of the year before the presidential election. Vacancies in the fiscal officership or on the board of trustees are filled by the remaining trustees.

References

External links
County website

Townships in Paulding County, Ohio
Townships in Ohio